The 1935–1936 SM-sarja season was played between 4 teams from 2 cities. For the first time there was straight relegation facing the team who would finish the lowest. The teams played 6 games each.

SM-sarja championship 

Ilves Wins the 1935–36 SM-sarja championship, Helsingfors Skridskoklubb is relegated to 1. Divisioona.

References
 Hockey Archives

Liiga seasons
Fin
1935–36 in Finnish ice hockey